Heimdallia is an ichnogenus comprising a strange planar trace that does not have a circular cross-section; its maker may have been fed upon by Beaconella.  

The trace was probably made by a small crustacean.

References

Arthropod trace fossils